Robert Mayer Lumiansky (1913–1987) was an American scholar of Medieval English and president of the American Council of Learned Societies.

Born in Darlington, South Carolina, Robert Lumiansky received a bachelor's degree from The Citadel, a master's degree from the University of South Carolina, and a doctorate from the University of North Carolina. He was professor and chairman of the English Department at the University of Pennsylvania from 1965 to 1973 and professor of English at New York University from 1975 to 1983. He was a member of both the American Academy of Arts and Sciences and the American Philosophical Society. He died April 2, 1987.

Works 
A Study of the English Ablaut Verbs, 1935
Of Sondry Folk: The Dramatic Principle in the Canterbury Tales, 1955
Critical Approaches to Six Major English Works: Beowulf Through Paradise Lost, 1968 (as editor with Herschel Clay Baker)
The Chester Mystery Cycle, 1974
Malory's Originality: A Critical Study of Le Morte Darthur, 1977
Chaucer's Canterbury Tales, 1979
Le Morte Darthur, 1982
"Sir Thomas Malory's Le Morte Darthur, 1947-1987: Author, Title, Text". Speculum Vol. 62, No. 4 (Oct., 1987), pp. 878–897. The University of Chicago Press on behalf of the Medieval Academy of America

References 

New York Times obituary
American Council of Learned Societies

New York University faculty
University of Pennsylvania faculty
American academics of English literature
1913 births
1987 deaths
20th-century American non-fiction writers
The Citadel, The Military College of South Carolina alumni

Members of the American Philosophical Society
Presidents of the American Council of Learned Societies